James Monroe High School is located in Fredericksburg, Virginia. It is a four-year public high school in the Fredericksburg City Schools system. The school is named after James Monroe. The current school building opened to students in September 2006.  James Monroe High School is part of the VHSL AA Battlefield District.

James Monroe High School is fully accredited by the Virginia State Department of Education.

History

Opened in 1920, the building now known as Maury School was Fredericksburg's first real high school.  It was originally called Fredericksburg High School, but in 1939, this name was changed to honor the nation's fifth president, James Monroe, who had his law office in the city from 1786-89.

The second James Monroe High School building was constructed in 1952, and a wing was added in 1959. From 1981-83, a large renovation project modernized the entire building, and another wing was added. The Arthur H. Schwartz Memorial Athletic Complex was constructed during 1985-86, providing a new track, tennis courts, and a baseball field.

Up until 2005, Fredericksburg City Public Schools used an unusual system of grade levels and schools. James Monroe High School carried 8th through 12th grades. However, the construction of a new upper elementary school in the school district  in 2005 allowed for the system to become standardized. The class of 2009 was the last eighth grade class of James Monroe High School.

The second high school was demolished in June through August 2006. The new replacement high school began construction in June 2004. It opened August 2006, and is built in the back of the second high school.  The Class of 2010 was the first graduating class to go through all four years at the third JMHS.

VHSL State Championships

2019 Field Hockey
2018 Field Hockey
2017 Field Hockey
2010 Boys' Golf
2009 Academic Quiz Team
2008 Football 
2005 Academic Quiz Team
2003 Boys' tennis 
2002 Boys' tennis 
1996 Football
1990 Boys' tennis 
1987 Football 
1986 Football 
1972 Boys' Basketball
1969 Boys' Basketball
1963 Boys' Basketball
1959 Boys' Track

Notable alumni

 Gerry Kissell, Comic book artist, creator of Code Word: Geronimo for IDW Publishing (class of 1982)
 George Coghill, retired defensive back for the Denver Broncos, Member of Wake Forest Hall of Fame
 Keller Williams, one man jam band (class of 1988)
 Judge Reinhold, actor in Beverly Hills Cop, The Santa Clause, Fast Times at Ridgemont High & other films
 Jack Rose, guitarist
 Randy Heflin, pitcher for the Boston Red Sox from 1945-1946
 Herb Hash, pitcher for the Boston Red Sox in 1940 and 1941

References

External links
James Monroe High School
Fredericksburg City Schools Homepage
James Monroe High School Library

Educational institutions established in 1939
Public high schools in Virginia
Schools in Fredericksburg, Virginia
1939 establishments in Virginia